Macrocalamus lateralis is a species of snake in the family Colubridae. The species is endemic to southern Thailand and Peninsular Malaysia.

References

Further reading
Boulenger GA (1894). Catalogue of the Snakes in the British Museum (Natural History). Volume II., Containing the Conclusion of the Colubridæ Aglyphæ. London: Trustees of the British Museum (Natural History). (Taylor and Francis, printers). xi + 382 pp. + Plates I-XX. (Macrocalamus lateralis, p. 327).
David P, Pauwels OSG (2004). "A re-evaluation of the taxonomy of Macrocalamus lateralis Günther, 1864 (Serpentes: Colubridae), with the description of two new species". Raffles Bull. Zool. 52 (2): 635–645. (Macrocalamus lateralis, pp. 640–642, Figures 5–6).
Günther ACLG (1864). The Reptiles of British India. London: The Ray Society. (Taylor and Francis, printers). xxvii + 452 pp. + Plates I-XXVI. (Macrocalamus lateralis, new species, p. 199 + Plate XVIII, Figure D).

Reptiles described in 1864
Taxa named by Albert Günther
Colubrids
Snakes of Southeast Asia
Reptiles of Malaysia